Teddy Bear is the fourth single album by South Korean girl group STAYC. It was released by High Up Entertainment on February 14, 2023, and contains two tracks, including the lead single of the same name.

Background and release
On January 18, 2023, High Up Entertainment announced that STAYC would be releasing an album in February. On January 31, it was announced STAYC would be releasing their fourth single album titled Teddy Bear on February 14. On February 1, the promotional schedule was released. On February 3, the Korean version of "Poppy", which was previously released as the Japanese-language debut single, was pre-released alongside its performance music video. The music video teasers for lead single "Teddy Bear" was released on February 5 and 12. The single album was released alongside the music video for "Teddy Bear" on February 14.

Composition
Teddy Bear consists of two tracks. The lead single "Teddy Bear" was described as a pop punk song with lyrics that "contains a message of positivity that gives hope and comfort". The second track "Poppy" was described as a "quirky" pop song with "an addictive chorus, and lovely yet kitsch mood".

Commercial performance
Teddy Bear debuted at number one on South Korea's Circle Album Chart in the chart issue dated February 12–18, 2023.

Promotion
Following the release of Teddy Bear, on February 14, 2023, STAYC held a live event to introduce the single album and communicate with their fans.

Track listing

Charts

Weekly charts

Monthly charts

Sales

Release history

References

STAYC albums
Single albums
Korean-language albums